Schlettau is a town in the district of Erzgebirgskreis, in Saxony in Germany. It is situated in the Ore Mountains, 5 km southwest of Annaberg-Buchholz, and 12 km east of Schwarzenberg.

History 
From 1952 to 1990, Schlettau was part of the Bezirk Karl-Marx-Stadt of East Germany.

References 

Erzgebirgskreis